In Greek mythology, Menelaus ('wrath of the people') was a king of Mycenaean (pre-Dorian) Sparta. According to the Iliad, Menelaus was a central figure in the Trojan War, leading the Spartan contingent of the Greek army, under his elder brother Agamemnon, king of Mycenae. Prominent in both the Iliad and Odyssey, Menelaus was also popular in Greek vase painting and Greek tragedy, the latter more as a hero of the Trojan War than as a member of the doomed House of Atreus.

Description 
In the account of Dares the Phrygian, Menelaus was described as ". . .of moderate stature, auburn-haired, and handsome. He had a pleasing personality."

Family 
Menelaus was a descendant of Pelops son of Tantalus. He was the younger brother of Agamemnon, and the husband of Helen of Troy. According to the usual version of the story, followed by the Iliad and Odyssey of Homer, Agamemnon and Menelaus were the sons of Atreus, king of Mycenae and Aerope daughter of the Cretan king Catreus. However, according to another tradition, Agamemnon and Menelaus were the sons of Atreus' son Pleisthenes, with their mother being Aerope, Cleolla, or Eriphyle. According to this tradition Pleisthenes died young, with Agamemnon and Menelaus being raised by Atreus. Agamemnon and Menelaus had a sister Anaxibia (or Astyoche) who married Strophius, the son of Crisus.

According to the Odyssey, Menelaus had only one child by Helen, a daughter Hermione, and an illegitimate son Megapenthes by a slave. Other sources mention other sons of Menelaus by either Helen, or slaves. A scholiast on Sophocles' Electra quotes Hesiod as saying that after Hermione, Helen also bore Menelaus a son Nicostratus, while according to a Cypria fragment, Menelaus and Helen had a son Pleisthenes. The mythographer Apollodorus, tells us that Megapenthes' mother was a slave "Pieris, an Aetolian, or, according to Acusilaus, ... Tereis", and that Menelaus had another illegitimate son Xenodamas by another slave girl Cnossia, while according to the geographer Pausanias, Megapenthes and Nicostratus were sons of Menelaus by a slave. The scholiast on Iliad 3.175 mentions Nicostratus and Aethiolas as two sons of Helen (by Menelaus?) worshipped by the Lacedaemonians and another son of Helen by Menelaus, Maraphius, from whom descended the Persian Maraphions.

Mythology

Ascension and reign
Although early authors, such as Aeschylus refer in passing to Menelaus' early life, detailed sources are quite late, post-dating 5th-century BC Greek tragedy. According to these sources, Menelaus' father, Atreus, had been feuding with his brother Thyestes over the throne of Mycenae. After a back-and-forth struggle that featured adultery, incest, and cannibalism, Thyestes gained the throne after his son Aegisthus murdered Atreus. As a result, Atreus' sons, Menelaus and Agamemnon, went into exile. They first stayed with King Polypheides of Sicyon, and later with King Oeneus of Calydon. But when they thought the time was ripe to dethrone Mycenae's hostile ruler, they returned. Assisted by King Tyndareus of Sparta, they drove Thyestes away, and Agamemnon took the throne for himself.

When it was time for Tyndareus' stepdaughter Helen to marry, many kings and princes came to seek her hand. Among the contenders were Odysseus, Menestheus, Ajax the Great, Patroclus, and Idomeneus. Most offered opulent gifts. Tyndareus would accept none of the gifts, nor would he send any of the suitors away for fear of offending them and giving grounds for a quarrel. Odysseus promised to solve the problem in a satisfactory manner if Tyndareus would support him in his courting of Tyndareus's niece Penelope, the daughter of Icarius. Tyndareus readily agreed, and Odysseus proposed that, before the decision was made, all the suitors should swear a most solemn oath to defend the chosen husband in any quarrel. Then it was decreed that straws were to be drawn for Helen's hand. The suitor who won was Menelaus (Tyndareus, not to displease the mighty Agamemnon offered him another of his daughters, Clytaemnestra). The rest of the suitors swore their oaths, and Helen and Menelaus were married, Menelaus becoming a ruler of Sparta with Helen after Tyndareus and Leda abdicated the thrones.

Their supposed palace (ἀνάκτορον) has been discovered (the excavations started in 1926 and continued until 1995) in Pellana, Laconia, to the north-west of modern (and classical) Sparta. Other archaeologists consider that Pellana is too far away from other Mycenaean centres to have been the "capital of Menelaus".

Trojan War

According to legend, in return for awarding her a golden apple inscribed "to the fairest," Aphrodite promised Paris the most beautiful woman in all the world. After concluding a diplomatic mission to Sparta during the latter part of which Menelaus was absent to attend the funeral of his maternal grandfather Catreus in Crete, Paris ran off to Troy with Helen despite his brother Hector's prohibition. Invoking the oath of Tyndareus, Menelaus and Agamemnon raised a fleet of a thousand ships and went to Troy to secure Helen's return; the Trojans refused, providing a casus belli for the Trojan War.

Homer's Iliad is the most comprehensive source for Menelaus's exploits during the Trojan War. In Book 3, Menelaus challenges Paris to a duel for Helen's return. Menelaus soundly beats Paris, but before he can kill him and claim victory, Aphrodite spirits Paris away inside the walls of Troy. In Book 4, while the Greeks and Trojans squabble over the duel's winner, Athena inspires the Trojan Pandarus to shoot Menelaus with his bow and arrow. However, Athena never intended for Menelaus to die and she protects him from the arrow of Pandarus. Menelaus is wounded in the abdomen, and the fighting resumes. Later, in Book 17, Homer gives Menelaus an extended aristeia as the hero retrieves the corpse of Patroclus from the battlefield.

According to Hyginus, Menelaus killed eight men in the war, and was one of the Greeks hidden inside the Trojan Horse. During the sack of Troy, Menelaus killed Deiphobus, who had married Helen after the death of Paris.

There are four versions of Menelaus' and Helen's reunion on the night of the sack of Troy:
Menelaus sought out Helen in the conquered city. Raging at her infidelity, he raised his sword to kill her, but as he saw her weeping at his feet, begging for her life, Menelaus' wrath instantly left him. He took pity on her and decided to take her back as his wife.
Menelaus resolved to kill Helen, but her irresistible beauty prompted him to drop his sword and take her back to his ship "to punish her at Sparta", as he claimed.
According to the Bibliotheca, Menelaus raised his sword in front of the temple in the central square of Troy to kill her, but his wrath went away when he saw her rending her clothes in anguish, revealing her naked breasts.
A similar version by Stesichorus in "Ilion's Conquest" narrated that Menelaus surrendered her to his soldiers to stone her to death, but when she ripped the front of her robes, the Achaean warriors were stunned by her beauty and the stones fell harmlessly from their hands as they stared at her.

After the war

Book 4 of the Odyssey provides an account of Menelaus' return from Troy and his homelife in Sparta. When visited by Odysseus' son Telemachus, Menelaus recounts his voyage home. As happened to many Greeks, Menelaus' homebound fleet was blown by storms to Crete and Egypt where they were becalmed, unable to sail away. They trapped Proteus and forced him to reveal how to make the voyage home. Once back in Sparta, he and Helen are shown to be reconciled and have a harmonious married life—he holding no grudge at her having run away with a lover and she feeling no restraint in telling anecdotes of her life inside besieged Troy. Menelaus does seem to be pained that he and Helen have no male heir, and is shown to be fond of Megapenthes and Nicostratus, his sons by slave women. According to Euripides' Helen, Menelaus is reunited with Helen after death, on the Isle of the Blessed.

In vase painting
Menelaus appears in Greek vase painting in the 6th to 4th centuries BC, such as: Menelaus's reception of Paris at Sparta; his retrieval of Patroclus's corpse; and his reunion with Helen.

In Greek tragedy
Menelaus appears as a character in a number of 5th-century Greek tragedies: Sophocles' Ajax, and Euripides' Andromache, Helen, Orestes, Iphigenia at Aulis, and The Trojan Women.

See also
 1647 Menelaus, Jovian asteroid
 USS Menelaus (ARL-13)
 Menelaus (lunar crater)

Notes

References 
 Apollodorus, Apollodorus, The Library, with an English Translation by Sir James George Frazer, F.B.A., F.R.S. in 2 Volumes. Cambridge, Massachusetts, Harvard University Press; London, William Heinemann Ltd. 1921. Online version at the Perseus Digital Library.
 Collard, Christopher and Martin Cropp (2008a), Euripides Fragments: Aegeus–Meleanger,  Loeb Classical Library No. 504, Cambridge, Massachusetts, Harvard University Press, 2008. . Online version at Harvard University Press.
 Collard, Christopher and Martin Cropp (2008b), Euripides Fragments: Oedipus-Chrysippus: Other Fragments,  Loeb Classical Library No. 506, Cambridge, Massachusetts, Harvard University Press, 2008. . Online version at Harvard University Press.
 Dictys Cretensis, The Trojan War. The Chronicles of Dictys of Crete and Dares the Phrygian, translated by R. M. Frazer (Jr.). Indiana University Press. 1966.
 Euripides, Andromache in Euripides: Children of Heracles. Hippolytus. Andromache. Hecuba, edited and translated by David Kovacs, Loeb Classical Library No. 484. Cambridge, Massachusetts, Harvard University Press, 1995. . Online version at Harvard University Press.
 Euripides, Helen, translated by E. P. Coleridge in  The Complete Greek Drama, edited by Whitney J. Oates and Eugene O'Neill, Jr. Volume 2. New York. Random House. 1938. Online version at the Perseus Digital Library.
 Euripides, Iphigenia in Tauris, translated by Robert Potter in The Complete Greek Drama, edited by Whitney J. Oates and Eugene O'Neill, Jr. Volume 2. New York. Random House. 1938. Online version at the Perseus Digital Library.
 Euripides, Orestes, translated by E. P. Coleridge in The Complete Greek Drama, edited by Whitney J. Oates and Eugene O'Neill, Jr. Volume 1. New York. Random House. 1938. Online version at the Perseus Digital Library.
 Fowler, R. L., Early Greek Mythography: Volume 2: Commentary, Oxford University Press, 2013. .
 Gantz, Timothy, Early Greek Myth: A Guide to Literary and Artistic Sources, Johns Hopkins University Press, 1996, Two volumes:  (Vol. 1),  (Vol. 2).
 Grimal, Pierre, The Dictionary of Classical Mythology, Wiley-Blackwell, 1996. .
 Hard, Robin, The Routledge Handbook of Greek Mythology: Based on H.J. Rose's "Handbook of Greek Mythology", Psychology Press, 2004, . Google Books.
 Homer, The Iliad with an English Translation by A.T. Murray, Ph.D. in two volumes. Cambridge, MA., Harvard University Press; London, William Heinemann, Ltd. 1924. Online version at the Perseus Digital Library.
 Homer, The Odyssey with an English Translation by A.T. Murray, PH.D. in two volumes. Cambridge, MA., Harvard University Press; London, William Heinemann, Ltd. 1919. Online version at the Perseus Digital Library.
 Hyginus, Gaius Julius, Fabulae, in The Myths of Hyginus, edited and translated by Mary A. Grant, Lawrence: University of Kansas Press, 1960. Online version at ToposText.
 Most, G.W., Hesiod: The Shield, Catalogue of Women, Other Fragments, Loeb Classical Library, No. 503, Cambridge, Massachusetts, Harvard University Press, 2007, 2018. . Online version at Harvard University Press.
 Parada, Carlos, Genealogical Guide to Greek Mythology, Jonsered, Paul Åströms Förlag, 1993. .
 Pausanias, Pausanias Description of Greece with an English Translation by W.H.S. Jones, Litt.D., and H.A. Ormerod, M.A., in 4 Volumes. Cambridge, Massachusetts, Harvard University Press; London, William Heinemann Ltd. 1918. Online version at the Perseus Digital Library.
 Tzetzes, John, Allegories of the Iliad translated by Goldwyn, Adam J. and Kokkini, Dimitra. Dumbarton Oaks Medieval Library, Harvard University Press, 2015. 
 Sophocles, The Ajax of Sophocles. Edited with introduction and notes by Sir Richard Jebb, Sir Richard Jebb. Cambridge. Cambridge University Press. 1893 Online version at the Perseus Digital Library.
 Sophocles, Electra in Sophocles. Ajax. Electra. Oedipus Tyrannus, Edited and translated by Hugh Lloyd-Jones, Loeb Classical Library No. 20, Cambridge, Massachusetts, Harvard University Press, 1994. . Online version at Harvard University Press.
 West, M. L., Greek Epic Fragments: From the Seventh to the Fifth Centuries BC, edited and translated by Martin L. West, Loeb Classical Library No. 497, Cambridge, Massachusetts, Harvard University Press, 2003.  . Online version at Harvard University Press.

External links

 

Achaean Leaders
Greek mythological heroes
Mythological kings of Sparta
Kings in Greek mythology
Characters in the Odyssey
Laconian mythology